The Ecclesiastical History Society (EHS) is a British learned historical society founded in 1961 to foster interest in, and to advance the study of, all areas of the history of the Christian Church through twice yearly conferences and publications. Founders include C. W. Dugmore of King's College, University of London, Dom David Knowles (the first President), and W. H. C. Frend.  Since then the EHS has held annual conferences based on themes suggested by successive Presidents.

There was an Ecclesiastical History Society during the 19th century. The present society's history written by Stella Fletcher is called A Very Agreeable Society. Both historians of nonconformity (including Clyde Binfield, Geoffrey Nuttall, and W. R. Ward) and Catholic historians (including Eamon Duffy and Bill Sheils) have been Presidents of the EHS. The society publishes Studies in Church History which reviews current approaches to ecclesiastical history that have been presented at the summer and winter conferences of the EHS. Membership comes in two categories: members and fellows. The Ecclesiastical History Society is a registered charity.

Fellows of the Ecclesiastical History Society include: Rowan Williams, Isabel Rivers, Janet Nelson, Owen Chadwick, Henry Chadwick, Diarmaid MacCulloch, Geoffrey Nuttall, Walter Ullmann, Alec Vidler, Eamon Duffy, William Frend, and Averil Cameron.

Presidents

References

External links
 

1961 establishments in the United Kingdom
Organizations established in 1961
History organisations based in London
Professional associations based in the United Kingdom
Social history of the United Kingdom
Learned societies of the United Kingdom
Presidents of the Ecclesiastical History Society